Hillcroft is one of the neighborhoods of York in York County, Pennsylvania, United States. Hillcroft is located in Spring Garden Township.

References

Unincorporated communities in Pennsylvania